Mordellistena bivittata is a beetle in the genus Mordellistena of the family Mordellidae. It was described in 1875 by Maeklin.

References

bivittata
Beetles described in 1875